Howard Douglas Stendahl (born August 1, 1951) is the Chief of Chaplains of the United States Air Force, promoted to Major General with an effective date of August 2, 2012. He was officially promoted and installed as the Air Force Chief of Chaplains at a ceremony held at Bolling Air Force Base on August 31, 2012.

Early life

Born and reared in St. Paul, Minnesota, Stendahl was ordained in 1977 into the ministry of The American Lutheran Church now a part of the Evangelical Lutheran Church in America.  He studied Clinical Pastoral Education and served as a parish pastor in Texas and Wisconsin before entering the Air Force Chaplain Service in 1985.

Education
According to Stendahl's official U.S. Air Force bio, his education includes:
1973 Bachelor of Arts, Hamline University, St. Paul Minn.
1977 Master of Divinity, Luther Theological Seminary, St. Paul Minn.
1988 Squadron Officer School (Residence)
1994 Doctor of Ministry, Graduate Theological Foundation, South Bend Ind.
1995 Air Command and Staff College (Residence)
2001 Air War College (Seminar)
2004 Master of Strategic Studies, Air War College (Residence)

Military assignments
Stendahls's past assignments, prior to his promotion to brigadier general and assignment as U.S. Air Force deputy chief of chaplains, included:
1985 - Chaplain, Basic Military Training School, Permanent Party Chapel, Lackland AFB TX
1988 - Protestant Chaplain, Shaw AFB SC (deployed to Al Dhafra AB, UAE 1990-91)
1991 - Chaplain to Cadets, U.S. Air Force Academy, Colo.
1994 - Student, Air Command and Staff College, Maxwell AFB, Ala.
1995 - Senior Protestant Chaplain, Vandenberg AFB, Calif.
1997 - Command Staff Chaplain, U.S. European Command, Patch Barracks, Stuttgart-Vaihingen GE
1999 - Senior Staff Chaplain, HQ Air Force Recruiting Service, Randolph AFB, Texas
2002 - Wing Chaplain, Ellsworth AFB, S.D.
2003 - Student, Air War College, Maxwell AFB, Ala.
2004 - Director, USAF Chaplain Service Institute, Maxwell AFB, Ala.
2006 - Command Chaplain, Air Education and Training Command, Randolph AFB, Texas
2009 - Command Chaplain, Air Combat Command, Langley AFB, Va.

Awards and honors
Stendahl's numerous military awards include:

 

Doctor of Divinity, Honoris Causa, Lutheran Theological Southern Seminary of Lenoir-Rhyne University, May 24, 2014.

See also
Chief of Chaplains of the United States Air Force
Armed Forces Chaplains Board

References

United States Air Force generals
Living people
American religious leaders
Evangelical Lutheran Church in America Christians
1951 births
Deputy Chiefs of Chaplains of the United States Air Force
Chiefs of Chaplains of the United States Air Force
Recipients of the Legion of Merit
Graduate Theological Foundation alumni